A pipe-and-cable-laying plough or moleplough is a method to bury cables or pipes.
The machinery is a form of a subsoiler with a single blade. It is used to lay buried services of virtually any description, for drainage, water, electricity, telecommunications, gas supply etc.. A coil of the service pipe/cable is mounted on the tractor and is led down a guide behind the blade, and is left buried behind the plough in a single operation, without the need to predig a deep trench and re-fill it. 

This process is normally used in rural areas where previously buried services will not be encountered and there are no hardened surfaces, e.g. tarmac concrete etc..

There are also specialised laying ploughs for cable laying behind traffic barriers, in stream or lake beds or even for the laying of submarine cables in deep sea, so-called sea ploughs. Sea ploughs are pulled behind cable ships and bury the cable in the sea bed. Burying submarine cables helps protect them from anchors, trawlers and other risks.

One early recorded attempted use by the British was in 1855 during the Crimean War, however the plough was found to be too light for the frozen soil.

References

Trenchless technology
Ploughs